Argus is the third album by the British rock band Wishbone Ash, released on 28 April 1972. It is their most commercially and critically successful album. It peaked at No. 3 in the UK Albums Chart.

Recording 
Although not intended as a concept album, the album is medieval-themed to a degree, particularly on the second side. The album features a blend of progressive rock, folk, and hard rock, and is considered a landmark album in the progression of twin-lead guitar harmonisation, later adopted by bands such as Thin Lizzy and Iron Maiden. The sound engineer on Argus was Martin Birch, who also worked with Deep Purple, later with Black Sabbath, Iron Maiden and other hard rock bands. The bulk of the lyrics were provided by bassist/lead vocalist Martin Turner, although all members are credited with the music and arrangements. The album was produced by Derek Lawrence.

Artwork
The album cover was made by Storm Thorgerson and it features a warrior overlooking a landscape at Gorge du Verdun in Provence, France. The costume was borrowed from the wardrobe of Ken Russell’s 1971 film The Devils and to this day, the identity of the person wearing the costume remains unknown. For many years, it is rumored that the warrior is the main inspiration for the character design of Darth Vader in Star Wars. Andy Powell acknowledged this rumor although he himself cannot confirm if it is true.

Release 
Argus was released on vinyl record on 28 April 1972. It was later released on CD in 2002, featuring a remix (by Martin Turner) of the original album as well as the three live tracks from the EP Live from Memphis promotional EP, recorded in the studios of WMC-FM.

In 2007, a 2-CD deluxe edition of Argus was released in Europe by Island Records. This included the 1972 mix as well as additional BBC Session tracks.

In 2008, Martin Turner released a new studio recording of Argus entitled Argus Through the Looking Glass. Wishbone Ash released a live version of the album, Argus "Then Again" Live.

Critical reception 

Argus was named "Album of the Year" in the 1972 year-end issue of Sounds.

William Ruhlmann of AllMusic gave the album a rating of 4 out of 5 stars, praising the instrumentation and writing that "it set up the commercial breakthrough enjoyed by the band's next album, Wishbone Four, but over the years it came to be seen as the quintessential Wishbone Ash recording, the one that best realized the group's complex vision."

Influence 
In an interview with Guitar World in 2011, Steve Harris from Iron Maiden said "I think if anyone wants to understand Maiden's early thing, in particular the harmony guitars, all they have to do is listen to Wishbone Ash's Argus album."

Track listing 
Music by Wishbone Ash, lyrics by Martin Turner, except "Time Was" by Ted Turner and Martin Turner, and "Leaf and Stream" by Steve Upton.

All lead vocals were performed by Martin Turner with Andy Powell (&), unless otherwise noted.

Note: track timings on the gatefold sleeve of early editions are incorrect. For example, "Time Was" is listed as 9:00 and not the correct 9:42.

First reissue bonus tracks
Music by Wishbone Ash;
Lyrics by Martin Turner.
 "No Easy Road" – 3:36

Live From Memphis EP bonus tracks
All songs composed by Wishbone Ash.
 "Jail Bait" – 4:57
 "The Pilgrim" – 10:10
 "Phoenix" – 17:05

2007 deluxe edition
Disc One
 "Time Was"
 "Sometime World"
 "Blowin' Free"
 "The King Will Come"
 "Leaf and Stream"
 "Warrior"
 "Throw Down the Sword"
 "No Easy Road"
 "The Pilgrim" (live in Memphis 1972)
 "Phoenix" (live in Memphis 1972)

Disc Two
 "Time Was" (BBC in concert session 1972)
 "Blowin' Free" (BBC in concert session 1972)
 "Warrior" (BBC in concert session 1972)
 "Throw Down the Sword" (BBC in concert session 1972)
 "King Will Come" (BBC in concert session 1972)
 "Phoenix" (BBC in concert session 1972)
 "Blowin' Free" (BBC session 1972)
 "Throw Down The Sword" (BBC session 1972)

Personnel

Wishbone Ash
 Martin Turner – bass guitar, vocals
 Andy Powell – lead (all tracks except 4), harmony lead, rhythm and acoustic guitars, vocals
 Ted Turner – lead (tracks 2, 3, 4, 6), slide (track 3), harmony lead, rhythm and acoustic guitars, vocals
 Steve Upton – drums (all tracks except 5), percussion

Additional personnel
 John Tout – organ on "Throw Down The Sword"

Charts

Certifications

References

Wishbone Ash albums
Albums with cover art by Hipgnosis
Albums produced by Derek Lawrence
1972 albums
MCA Records albums